Southern Christian Institute was a boarding school for African American students in Edwards, Mississippi. In 1954 it merged with Tougaloo College. SCI was added to the National Register of Historic Places in 2007.

It was established by Christian organizations for the education of African Americans in the South after the American Civil War. Joel Baer Lehman served as president of the school from 1890 to 1933. 

An all class reunion was held in 1979. The school site has served various other purposes since the school closed.

A 1924 / 1925 school catalogue is extant.

References

External links 

Defunct schools in Mississippi
Historic districts on the National Register of Historic Places in Mississippi
National Register of Historic Places in Hinds County, Mississippi
Tougaloo College
Educational institutions disestablished in 1954
African-American history of Mississippi
Schools in Hinds County, Mississippi